Ecuador competed in the 2015 Pan American Games in Toronto, Ontario, Canada from July 10 to 26, 2015.

Karateka Jacqueline Factos was named the flagbearer of the country at the opening ceremony.

Competitors
The following table lists Ecuador's delegation per sport and gender.

Archery

Ecuador qualified one male archer based on its performance at the 2014 Pan American Championships.

Athletics

Badminton

Ecuador qualified a team of two athletes (one man and one woman).

Boxing

Ecuador has qualified three male boxers.

Men

Canoeing

Sprint
Ecuador has qualified 5 athletes in the sprint discipline (1 in men's kayak, 2 in women's kayak, 1 in men's canoe and 1 in women's canoe).

Men

Women

Qualification Legend: QF = Qualify to final; QS = Qualify to semifinal

Cycling

Diving

Ecuador qualified one male diver.

Men

Equestrian

Football

Ecuador has qualified a women's team of 18 athletes.

Women's tournament

Roster

Group B

Golf

Ecuador qualified a full team of four golfers.

Gymnastics

Artistic
Ecuador qualified 2 gymnasts.

Men
Individual

Qualification Legend: Q = Qualified to apparatus final

Women
Individual

Qualification Legend: Q = Qualified to apparatus final

Rhythmic
Ecuador has qualified one athlete.

Individual

Qualification Legend: Q = Qualified to apparatus final

Judo

Ecuador has qualified a team of ten judokas (three men and seven women).

Men

Women

Karate

Ecuador qualified 6 karatekas.

Men

Modern pentathlon

Ecuador has qualified a team of 3 athletes (2 men and 1 woman).

Racquetball

Ecuador has qualified a team of three men and two women for a total of five athletes.

Roller sports

Ecuador has qualified a total of four athletes (one man in speed, and three women, two in speed and one in the figure competition).

Figure

Speed

Sailing

Ecuador qualified 4 boats.

Shooting

Ecuador has qualified seven shooters.

Swimming

Table tennis

Ecuador has qualified a men's team and a single woman.

Men

Women

Taekwondo

Ecuador has qualified a team of one female athlete, and also received a wildcard to enter a male athlete.

Tennis

Triathlon

Water polo

Ecuador has been reallocated a men's water polo team.

Men's tournament

The Ecuadorian men's team lost all of its matches and finished in eighth and last place.

Roster

Pool A

Fifth-Eight place round

Seventh place match

Water skiing

Ecuador qualified one athlete in the wakeboarding competition.

Men

Weightlifting

Ecuador has qualified a team of 9 athletes (5 men and 4 women).

Men

Women

Wrestling

See also
Ecuador at the 2016 Summer Olympics

References

Nations at the 2015 Pan American Games
P
2015